Chlorokybus is a multicellular (sarcinoid) genus of basal green algae or charophyte, a soil alga. It has been classified as the sole member of the family Chlorokybaceae, which is the sole member of the order Chlorokybales, in turn the sole member of the class Chlorokybophyceae.

Taxonomy
Chlorokybus atmophyticus was once thought to be the only species in the genus. In 2021, a study showed that there were at least four other species, morphologically indistinguishable, but with deep genomic differences, suggesting divergences possibly about 76 million years ago. Chlorokybus has been found in Eurasia, Central and South America.

Chlorokybus was placed in a new class, order and family. The new class Chlorokybophyceae was basal within the charophytes.

Within the genus, the species were related as shown in the cladogram:

References

External links
 The Delwiche Lab: Molecular Systematics

Charophyta
Charophyta genera